Carlo Carafa (29 March 1517 – 4 March 1561) was an Italian cardinal, and Cardinal Nephew of Pope Paul IV Carafa, whose policies he directed and whom he served as papal legate in Paris, Venice and Brussels.

Early years

He was born at Naples into one of the city's most ancient and distinguished families, a younger son of Giovanni Alfonso Carafa, count of Montorio, and his countess, Caterina Cantelma. One brother was Giovanni Carafa, Duke of Paliano another, Antonio Carafa (1520—1588), was made marchese di Montebello.

Without making a name for himself, he had a long and dubious career as a mercenary soldier in Italy and Germany. He entered the household of Cardinal Pompeo Colonna at an early age, as a page and was enrolled in the Order of St John of Jerusalem later, that of Pierluigi Farnese, Duke of Castro (later Duke of Parma), the son of Paul III. He then fought under the Alfonso d'Avalos, Marchese del Vasto, in Lombardy and Piedmont, and under Ottavio Farnese, Duke of Parma, in Flanders and Germany, fighting Protestants in the name of the Emperor. Here an incident occurred that reinforced perceptions among contemporaries for greed, arrogance and a violent nature: his possession of a captive gentleman worth a considerable ransom was challenged by a Spaniard, whose right was upheld by his compatriot, the Duke of Alba; and in the aftermath Carlo, pursuing his adversary to provoke a duel was incarcerated at Trento until he agreed not to pursue the vendetta.

He was subsequently exiled from Naples in 1545 for murder and banditry and, having withdrawn to Benevento, was embroiled in another assassination, and was then alleged to have perpetrated the massacre of Spanish soldiers as they recuperated in a hospital in Corsica.

Cardinal Nephew

Two weeks after Giovanni Pietro Carafa was elected pope, as Paul IV, he raised Carlo to the cardinalate on 7 June 1555. His tenure as Cardinal Nephew was not a great success, and he and Paul IV effectively brought the Papacy to a humiliating defeat against the Spanish that nearly resulted in another Sack of Rome. Carlo's government proved unpopular and he developed a reputation for avarice, cruelty and licentiousness, as well as for homosexual sodomy (Paul had chastised Cardinal Ghisleri for not sharing his suspicions on this latter point). In January 1559, Paul finally accepted the accuracy of the accusations made and exiled both his nephews from Rome and replaced Carlo as Cardinal Nephew with Carlo's own nephew Alfonso Carafa, Cardinal Archbishop of Naples.

Arrest and death

In June 1560, Paul's successor, Pope Pius IV arrested the leading members of the family - Carlo, his brother Duke Govanni, and their nephew the Cardinal Archbishop of Naples, seizing their papers, and levying a range of charges relating to abuses of power during Paul's reign. Carlo was charged with murder, sodomy, and the promotion of Protestantism. After a nine-month trial, he was condemned along with his brother, and was executed by strangulation at Castel Sant' Angelo on the night of 4 March 1561. His execution was considered at the time to have been motivated primarily by political factors such as his pro-French, anti-Spanish policies.

On September 26, 1567, the sentence was declared unjust by Pope Pius V. The memory of the victims was vindicated and their estates restored.

References

Bibliography

External links 
 Biography

1517 births
1561 deaths
Nobility from Naples
Cardinal-nephews
People executed by the Holy See
Carlo
Executed Italian people
People executed by strangulation
16th-century executions by Italian states
Clergy from Naples
Military personnel from Naples